Paul Thomson is the drummer for the band Franz Ferdinand.

Paul Thomson may also refer to:

 Paul Thomson (botanist) (1916–2008), American exotic fruit enthusiast
 Paul Thomson (composer) (born 1972), English film, television, and video game composer, co-founder of Spitfire Audio
 Paul Thomson (sailor) (1963–1994), Canadian sailor
 Paul van K. Thomson (1916–1999), Episcopal and Roman Catholic priest, professor and administrator at Providence College

See also 
 Paul Thompson (disambiguation)
 Poul Thomsen (1922–1988), Danish actor